Hiram Walden (August 21, 1800 – July 21, 1880) was an American businessman and politician from New York. He was most notable for his service as a  United States Representative from 1849 to 1851.

Biography
Walden was born in Pawlet, Vermont on August 21, 1800. He attended the district schools of Pawlet and moved to Berne, New York in 1818. In 1821, he moved to the hamlet of  Waldenville in what is now the town of Wright. Walden farmed and was involved in the manufacture of axes, a business he operated until it was destroyed in an 1846 fire.

He was a member of the New York State Assembly in 1836. In addition to his business interests, Walden was involved in the state militia and in 1839 he attained the rank of major general as commander of the 16th Division. He commanded the division until resigning in 1841. He was Schoharie's town supervisor from 1842 to 1844. When the town of Wright was created by separating it from Schoharie, Walden was Wright's first town supervisor, and he served from 1846 to 1849.

In 1848, Walden was the successful Democratic nominee for a seat in the United States House of Representatives. He served in the Thirty-first Congress (March 4, 1849 – March 3, 1851). During his House term, Walden was a member of the Committee on Invalid Pensions and chairman of the Committee on Patents. He was an unsuccessful candidate for  re-nomination in 1850.

After leaving Congress, Walden was employed as an inspector in New York City's United States Custom House. After retiring, he was a resident of Waldenville until his death on July 21, 1880. He was buried at Berne and Beaverdam Cemetery (formerly Pine Grove) in Berne, New York.

Family
In 1822, Walden married Sophia Dominick (1803-1893), daughter of John Dominick and Margaretha Ball. They were the parents of 10 children, of whom eight lived to adulthood.

Miner (b. 1823)
Hiram Jr. (b. 1828)
John D. (b. 1833)
Moses P. (b. 1835)
Albert D. (b. 1837)
Sylvanus (b. 1839)
Isaac D. (b. 1841)
Elmina Edna (b. 1844)

References

External links
 
 

1800 births
1880 deaths
American militia generals
Democratic Party members of the New York State Assembly
Democratic Party members of the United States House of Representatives from New York (state)
19th-century American politicians